Chu Chun (also Romanized as Chū Chūn and Choochoon; also known as Chīchow and Chīchū) is a village in Howmeh Rural District, in the Central District of Bam County, Kerman Province, Iran. At the 2006 census, its population was 43, in 16 families.

References 

Populated places in Bam County